John Horton Atwood (January 27, 1923 – July 13, 2008) was a professional American football player and company executive.

References

External links
 

1923 births
2008 deaths
American football halfbacks
New York Giants players
Wisconsin Badgers football players
Purdue Boilermakers football players
Purdue Boilermakers baseball players
United States Marine Corps personnel of World War II
United States Marines
Sportspeople from Janesville, Wisconsin
People from Walworth County, Wisconsin
Players of American football from Wisconsin
Baseball players from Wisconsin
Basketball players from Wisconsin
Military personnel from Wisconsin
American men's basketball players